American singer Lauren Jauregui has released one extended play, twelve singles (including three as a featured artist), and one promotional single as a featured artist. In 2012, Jauregui auditioned as a solo artist in the second season of The X Factor. After being eliminated as a solo performer, Jauregui was brought back into the competition along with four other girls to form the girl group Fifth Harmony. During her time in the group, Jauregui and her bandmates released the albums Reflection (2015), 7/27 (2016), and Fifth Harmony (2017).

In December 2016, Jauregui featured on Marian Hill's song "Back to Me". She later featured on Halsey's same-sex song "Strangers", a promotional single from Halsey's album Hopeless Fountain Kingdom (2017). Billboard noted "Strangers" as a "long-overdue bisexual milestone in mainstream music." In November 2017, Jauregui released the song "All Night" with Steve Aoki, from his album Neon Future III (2018). "All Night" was Jauregui's first release as a primary songwriter and lead singer. She also produced the vocals on the track.

In May 2018, Jauregui stated that she began working on her debut solo album. As the opening act of Halsey’s Latin American tour in June 2018, Jauregui performed three songs she had written, including "Expectations". Jauregui released her debut solo song "Expectations" with its music video in October 2018, under Columbia Records. She released the song "More Than That" in January 2019. In February 2020, Jauregui contributed to the soundtrack of the film Birds of Prey, and collaborated with Puerto Rican producer Tainy on his latin urban song "Nada" featuring C. Tangana. In March, she released the Tainy-produced song "Lento", followed by "50ft." in April. Her debut solo EP, Prelude, was released on November 5, 2021.

Extended plays

Singles

As lead artist

As featured artist

Promotional singles

Other charted songs

Other appearances

Music videos

Guest appearances

References

External links
 
 
 
 
 

Discographies of American artists
Discography